The office of Knight Marischal was first created for the Scottish coronation of Charles I in 1633, at Scone. Unlike the separate office of Marischal, the office of Knight Marischal is not heritable, and has continued to be filled up to the death of the 11th Duke of Hamilton in 1863. The office is vacant but has not been abolished.

At the time of the Jacobite rising of 1715, the Knight Marischal was a Keith, and with his kinsman George, the 10th Earl Marischal, was in rebellion. However, as the office is non-heritable, it could not be forfeited, although the holder was stripped of office.

The salary attached to the post was £400 in 1660. The Public Offices (Scotland) Act 1817 provided that no person thereafter appointed as Knight Marshall should receive a salary.

Knights Marischal 

 1660–1714: John Keith, 1st Earl of Kintore
 1714–1715: William Keith, 2nd Earl of Kintore
 1718–1732: Charles Hamilton, Lord Binning
 1733–1758: John Keith, 3rd Earl of Kintore
 1758: James Erskine, Lord Barjarg
 1785: Sir Robert Laurie, Bt
 1805: William Hay, 17th Earl of Erroll
 1819–1832: Alexander Keith, later Sir Alexander
 1832–1846: William George Hay, 18th Earl of Erroll
 1846–1863: William Hamilton, 11th Duke of Hamilton

References 

Political office-holders in Scotland
Lists of office-holders in Scotland
Positions within the British Royal Household
Ceremonial officers in the United Kingdom
1633 establishments in Scotland
1863 disestablishments